NBA ShootOut (Known as Total NBA '96 in Europe) is a sports video game developed by SCE Studios Soho and published by Sony Computer Entertainment exclusively for the PlayStation. The cover features Sam Cassell of the Houston Rockets.

Gameplay
NBA ShootOut is a game using polygon players and motion-captured animation. The game features rosters from the 1995–96 NBA season.

The demo of the European version of the game, (Total NBA '96) also contains additional hidden characters not available in the final game.

Reception

NBA ShootOut was well received, with the Official UK PlayStation Magazine awarding 9/10 and a Starplayer award. They praised the motion capture and the playability. While he noted sometimes inaccurate controls and glitchy sound effects, Scary Larry of GamePro gave the game a strong recommendation, citing the roster of real players, realistic features, beautiful polygonal graphics, and fluid animation. He commented that the game is much more realistic than NBA Jam, but has an arcade mode to satisfy Jam enthusiasts. The two sports reviewers of Electronic Gaming Monthly gave the game similar scores (8.0 and 7.5 out of 10) but were sharply divided in their opinions. Both agreed that the graphics are impressive, but Dindo Perez argued that "Shootout should have played greater emphasis on gameplay", saying it is not realistic enough, whereas Video Cowboy asserted "the game has solid gameplay and a big-league look." A reviewer for Next Generation shared in the general enthusiasm for the game's graphics and animation, but also noted that they come at the cost of prominent slowdown, detracting from the feel of the game. However, he felt the gameplay was decent and the options and player roster were impressive, and concluded "NBA Shoot Out doesn't unseat NBA Live 96 as the basketball sim champ, but it has definitely raised the stakes for next year's battle." He gave it three out of five stars. In 1996, GamesMaster ranked the game 88th on their "Top 100 Games of All Time."

The first NBA ShootOut (Total NBA ' 96) was a major hit in Europe, and moderately successful in North America.

Notes

References

External links

1996 video games
Multiplayer and single-player video games
National Basketball Association video games
PlayStation (console) games
PlayStation (console)-only games
Sony Interactive Entertainment games
Video games developed in the United Kingdom